Chicosci (officially stylized as ChicoSci) is a Filipino rock band based in Manila. The band is currently composed of Miggy Chavez, Mong Alcaraz, Eco del Rio and Victor Guison. The group's musical style primarily consists of rock with an emphasis of experimentation from nu metal and rap metal to pop punk, post-hardcore and emo.

Background

Formation and early days
ChicoSci (previously Chico Science) was originally composed of Miguel "Miggy" Chavez, Miguel "Mong" Alcaraz, Carlos "Calde" Calderon, and Joel Salvador from the Ateneo de Manila University. They later recruited guitarist Sonny Baquisal, long-time friend Eugene "Yug" Esquivias, and turntablist Bboy Garcia to solidify the songwriting process. The band won an inter-school Battle of the Bands and spent the prize money recording a demo – an investment that landed them a two-album record deal with EMI Philippines as A&R'ed by three executives for the EMI Local Label Bob Guzman, Larry Chua, and Darrell James Laxamana. The band released the albums Revenge of the Giant Robot and Method of Breathing.

Career as Chico Science
The highly successful debut record established support for Chico Science as one of the forerunners of the new generation of rock.  Revenge of the Giant Robot spawned hits such as "Amen", "Soopafly", and the MTV hit, "Sink or Swim". This album was also nominated to the prestigious Awit Awards for Best Rock Recording. Their first-ever music video "Sink or Swim", directed by Lyle Sacris, also won as the Best Directed Video for the 2001 MTV Pilipinas Awards. Later on, they decided to change the name Chico Science to ChicoSci, in order not to be confused with the Brazilian singer.

Career as ChicoSci
Always trying out new things, but the band continued to work on redefining their sound. Shifting their musical direction to a more melodic style, they sought Raimund Marasigan for guidance in working with their second album. True enough, both audiences and critics embraced the new sound of ChicoSci. Method Of Breathing included several hits such as "Glass is Broken", "Rolento", and "Paris". The latter holds the record for the most number of weeks a song (foreign or local) has stayed in a countdown. It stayed in the NU107 Midnight Countdown for more than 52 weeks and gave Chicosci the Song of the Year award at the 2002 NU 107 Rock Awards.

In 2004, the band released their third album, Icarus, under Viva Records. The band again enlisted the help of Marasigan, who brought along Buddy Zabala, to produce the band's most experimental album. In May 2004, the band gained media recognition by becoming MTV's Lokal Artist of the Month. The songs "Theme from Conversation with Fire", "Shallow Graves", and "An Argument", enjoyed media airtime, also went into the NU 107 Midnight and Year-end Countdown.

On June 6, 2006, ChicoSci released and launched their self-titled 4th album. Having been in the studio for more than a year, the band boasts it as being their best work to date. The self-produced album features catchier melodies and more synth playing from Alcaraz. At the same time, there is minimal screaming and more focus on Chavez's singing, the most obvious change on the self-titled album. On March 2, 2007, the repackaged edition of the self titled album were released.

With the release of their carrier single "A Promise", ChicoSci gained more popularity as their market grew. ChicoSci went on to play in Malaysia and Singapore as well as local hot spots like Cafe Saguijo. The album has spawned four singles, "A Promise", "Seven Black Roses", "ChicoSci Vampire Social Club" and "Last Look". The music video for "ChicoSci Vampire Social Club" won the Favorite Rock Video at the 2008 Myx Music Awards. The band released their fifth studio album, Fly Black Hearts in 2009.

ChicoSci also covered EMF song "Unbelievable" from the various artists album, 90's Music Comes Alive in 2012, the same year, the band also covered their first Tagalog song "Magasin"  from Eraserheads from The Reunion: An Eraserheads Tribute Album.

ChicoSci had a new single in 2012 or 2013 entitled "Raspberry: Girl" from their album This Is Not A Chicosci Record. Their first music video of this song was the Tower Sessions and the second music video is their official music video of this song.

ChicoSci has a new song in 2014, "Iyong Araw" for Colgate Fresh Jam. This is their first original Tagalog song.

2016 – 2018
Founding member Calde Calderon amicably left the group in 2016 due to unforeseen reasons and major change in career path. Calderon is now the website manager of myx. He was replaced by Jejaview's Eco Del Rio who is almost 10 years junior of the remaining band members. The band released their first single without Calderon on 2017 entitled "Buzzin'", which remarked the band's new approach on their music. The video was released on Tower of Doom's YouTube channel.

Chicosci released another single entitled "Revalation!" in 2018 with its accompanying music video. The song was very different from their past releases with the band's usage of heavy sampling.

Major lineup changes (2019-present)
Estacio started playing for Kamikazee when their drummer Allan Bordeos announced a hiatus from the band due to personal reasons. Estacio was asked to leave from the group without a formal announcement from any member of the band that he was already dismissed. Victor Guison of Franco took his place and is currently playing and recording for the band recently. Although it is still unclear, Lumanlan started not playing with the band during their recent gigs. Like Estacio, no formal announcement was made.

Criticism

Despite the group's commercial success, the band's vocalist Miggy Chavez is heavily criticized for his vocal quality on live performances. Although critics commended his live screaming and growling prowess, critics and listeners alike have been calling his live clean singing abilities as "abysmal", "flat", and "a bit messy", but praises his stage performances. Nonetheless, Chavez's vocal studio album performances have been receiving average praise.

Discography

Studio albums
2000 – Revenge of the Giant Robot
2002 – Method of Breathing
2004 – Icarus
2006 – ChicoSci
2009 – Fly Black Hearts
2012 – This Is Not A Chicosci Record

Awards and nominations

Members
Current
Miguel "Miggy" Chavez – lead vocals, additional guitar (1996–present)
Miguel "Mong" Alcaraz – lead guitar, piano, synthesizer, programming, sampling, effects, vocals (1996–present)
Eco del Rio – bass guitar, vocals (2016–present) 
Victor Guison –  drums (2019–present)
Former
Bboy Garcia – turntables (2000). Last appeared on Sink or Swim music video. He eventually joined Queso and briefly in Greyhoundz.
Eugene "Yug" Esquivias – percussions (2000–07). Last appeared on Seven Black Roses  music video. Esquivias left for Canada.
Sonny Baquisal – guitars (2000–07). Last seen on ChicoSci Vampire Social Club music video. Baquisal left to go to Italy with his family. Replaced by Ariel Lumanlan of the metalcore band Arcadia in November 2007.
Joel Salvador – drums (1996–2008). Last seen on ChicoSci Myx Live Performance. Left the band to pursue job opportunity abroad. Replaced by Macoy Estacio of the post-hardcore band April Morning Skies.
Carlos "Calde" Calderon – bass guitar, vocals (1996–2016). Calderon left the band due to career change. Replaced by Eco del Rio of the alternative rock band, Jejaview, and 88 City.
Mark "Macoy" Estacio – drums (2008–2019). No official statement of departure.
Ariel Lumanlan – rhythm and lead guitar (2007–2019). No official statement of departure.

References

External links
chicosci at rakista

Filipino rock music groups
Pop punk groups
Post-hardcore groups
Musical groups established in 1996
Musical groups from Metro Manila
MCA Music Inc. (Philippines) artists